Akeem Foster (born March 20, 1987) is a professional Canadian football wide receiver for the Kotka Eagles of the Finnish 1st Division. Prior to that, Foster had been a member of the Edmonton Eskimos of the Canadian Football League. He was drafted 25th overall by the BC Lions in the 2010 CFL Draft and signed a contract with the team on May 25, 2010. During the 2013 CFL season, the Lions traded him in exchange for Buck Pierce. He played college football for the St. Francis Xavier X-Men. Foster played for the Tri-Cities Fever of the Indoor Football League in 2016.

References

External links
Edmonton Eskimos bio 
Blue Bombers bio

1987 births
BC Lions players
Canadian football wide receivers
American football wide receivers
Black Canadian players of American football
Edmonton Elks players
Living people
People from Ajax, Ontario
St. Francis Xavier X-Men football players
Tri-Cities Fever players
Nebraska Danger players
Canadian expatriate sportspeople in Finland